This article gives a summary of results for the Belgian Second Division play-offs from 2001 to 2010.

2001

Results and table

2002

Qualifiers
The following teams qualified for the 2002 play-offs:
 K. Heusden-Zolder as winner of the second period
 K.S.V. Ingelmunster as second of the second division
 R.A.E.C. Mons as third of the second division
 Cercle Brugge K.S.V. as sixth of the second division

Periods 1 and 3 were won by champion K.V. Mechelen and Heusden-Zolder finished 4th of the second division.

Results and table

2003

Qualifiers
The following teams qualified for the 2003 play-offs:
 K. Heusden-Zolder as winner of the first and second periods
 K.A.S. Eupen as second of the second division
 S.V. Zulte-Waregem as fourth of the second division
 F.C. Denderleeuw as fifth of the second division

Period 3 was won by champion Cercle Brugge K.S.V. and Heusden-Zolder finished 3rd of the second division.

Results and table

2004

Qualifiers
The following teams qualified for the 2004 play-offs:
 K.F.C. Verbroedering Geel as winner of the first period
 A.F.C. Tubize as winner of the second period
 K.V. Oostende as second of the second division
 K.S.V. Roeselare as third of the second division

Period 3 was won by champion F.C. Molenbeek Brussels Strombeek.

Results and table

* Oostende finished 2nd in second division while Geel finished 10th.

2005

Qualifiers
The following teams qualified for the 2005 play-offs:
 K.S.V. Roeselare as winner of the 2nd period
 K.F.C. Verbroedering Geel as 3rd of the second division
 R. Antwerp F.C. as 4th of the second division
 K.V. Red Star Waasland as 5th of the second division

Periods 1 and 3 were won by champion S.V. Zulte-Waregem.

Results and table

2006

Qualifiers
The following teams qualified for the 2006 play-offs:
 Lierse S.K. as 17th of the Jupiler League
 K.V.S.K. United Overpelt-Lommel as 2nd of the second division
 K.F.C. Verbroedering Geel as 3rd of the second division
 K.F.C. V.W. Hamme as 4th of the second division

The period winners were not qualified as it was not decided before the beginning of the play-offs whether the points raised by clubs against Beringen-Heusden-Zolder were to be retired or not.

Results and table

2007

Qualifiers
The following teams qualified for the 2007 play-offs:
 Lierse S.K. as number 17 of the Belgian League
 Royal Antwerp FC as winner of the second period
 Y.R. K.V. Mechelen as 2nd of the second division
 K.V. Kortrijk as winner of the third period

Period 1 was won by champion F. C. Verbroedering Dender E.H.

Results and table

2008

Qualifiers
The following teams qualified for the 2008 play-offs:
 A.F.C. Tubize for finishing second
 Oud-Heverlee Leuven for finishing third
 K.V.S.K. United Overpelt-Lommel for finishing fourth
 Royal Antwerp FC for finishing fifth

Results and table

2009
As a result of the Belgian First Division reducing in size to 16 teams for 2009-10, there will be two playoffs in 2009. Firstly, the teams ranked between two and five in the second division will meet (best ranked team will play away first) with two teams progressing. These two teams progress into a second playoff (double round-robin), together with the teams placed 15 and 16 in the Belgian First Division 2008–09. The winner of this second playoff will play in the Belgian First Division 2009–10.

First playoff
The following teams qualified for the 2009 first playoff round:
 Lierse for finishing second.
 Antwerp for finishing third.
 Waasland for finishing fourth.
 Tournai for finishing fifth.

The draw was made on May 4, 2009 and resulted in the following games:

|}

Second playoff
The following teams qualified for the 2009 second playoff round:
 Dender, for finishing in 15th place in the Belgian First Division.
 Roeselare, for finishing in 16th place in the Belgian First Division.
 Antwerp, winners of the first playoff round.
 Lierse, winners of the first playoff round.

2010

Qualifiers
The following teams qualified for the 2010 play-offs:
 K.S.V. Roeselare for finishing fifteenth in the first division
 K.V.S.K. United Overpelt-Lommel for finishing second
 R.A.E.C. Mons for finishing third
 K.A.S. Eupen for finishing fourth

Results and table

References

Play-offs 2001-2010